Apherusa is a genus of amphipods belonging to the family Calliopiidae.

The species of this genus are found in Northern Hemisphere.

Species

Species:

Apherusa alacris 
Apherusa antiqua 
Apherusa barretti

References

Amphipoda